Herbert Richard Barnes Hull (27 October 1886 – 31 May 1970) was an English first-class cricketer and Royal Navy officer.

References

External links

1886 births
1970 deaths
People from Chippenham
Royal Navy officers
Royal Navy personnel of World War I
English cricketers
Royal Navy cricketers
Military personnel from Wiltshire